Roland Tay (born 1947) is an undertaker in Singapore. He is known for helping the poor and families of murder victims by providing pro-bono funeral arrangements. Memorial services conducted by Tay include Huang Na, Liu Hong Mei, and Ah Meng, a Singapore tourism icon.

Early life 
Born in 1947 as the fourth of 10 children to a hawker in a coffee shop along Lavender Street, Tay began his working life as a coffee boy at his family's coffee shop. He helped the family's coffee shop business by serving coffee and tea to customers in Singapore Casket and learned about the funeral trade.

When his father died, Tay converted the coffee shop into Casket Palace, which was subsequently bought over by Singapore Casket.

Career
In the subsequent years, Tay started several funeral companies including Tong Aik Undertaker and Direct Funeral Services.

Tong Aik Undertaker is in charge of operating the Singapore Police Force's police hearse, and also has operated as Direct Funeral Services since 2000.

In 2004, Tay with Direct Funeral Services conducted the pro-bono funeral of Huang Na, an eight-year-old girl who was murdered brutally in Pasir Panjang, Singapore. This was followed by another pro-bono funeral in 2005 of 22-year-old Chinese national Liu Hong Mei, who was murdered and chopped into seven parts before being dumped in the Kallang River. The process of sewing the body parts back together took Roland Tay and his embalmers 7 hours. He also oversaw the funeral of Li Hong Yan, a 24-year-old village girl from Heilongjiang who drowned at Sentosa.

Tay reportedly collected around three hundred identity cards of deceased persons whom were without family, and for whom he conducted pro bono funeral services.

One of Tay's more memorable cases is the pro bono funeral he provided for the primate tourism icon Ah Meng of Singapore.

In 2013, Tay brought his daughter Jenny Tay into the business, who subsequently helped him rebrand the undertaking firm after quitting her job at a marketing firm.

Personal life
In 2013, Tay and his wife, Sally Ho, filed and finalized their divorce in June. According to the court papers, the cumulated properties were estimated to be a total of about $20 million.

Notable pro bono cases

References

1947 births
Living people
Funeral directors
People from Singapore